Chad is a landlocked country in Africa.

Chad may also refer to:
 Chad (name), an English given name and surname
 Chad (chess variant), a chess variant by Christian Freeling
 Chad (graffiti) or Mr Chad, a British graffiti character
 Chad (paper), the particles created when holes are made in paper or cardboard
 Chad (slang), a slang term for a young, affluent, or "alpha" male
 Chad (Saturday Night Live), a fictional character parodying the slang term, played by Pete Davidson
 Chad (TV series), an American television show
 Chad of Mercia, 7th century Anglo-Saxon churchman, Bishop of York and of Lichfield, and later Saint
 Lake Chad, a body of water in Africa
 Lake Chad (Antarctica)
 Chad baronets, a 1791–1855 baronetcy for George Chad
 Chaddesden or Chad, a suburb of Derby, England
 ChAd, a simian adenovirus used to develop ChAdOx1

See also
 Chad-e Bala or Upper Chad, a village in Iran
 Chad-e Pain or Lower Chad, a village in Iran
 CHADS2 score, a clinical prediction rule for the risk of stroke
 Shad (disambiguation)